Massachusetts is a state located in the Northeastern United States. Municipalities in the state are classified as either towns or cities, distinguished by their form of government under state law. Towns have an open town meeting or representative town meeting form of government; cities, on the other hand, use a mayor-council or council-manager form. Based on the form of government, there are 292 towns and 59 cities in Massachusetts. Some municipalities, however, still refer to themselves as "towns" even though they have a city form of government.

The Census Bureau classifies towns in Massachusetts as a type of "minor civil division" and cities as a type of "populated place". However, from the perspective of Massachusetts law, politics, and geography, cities and towns are the same type of municipal unit, differing only in their form of government.

There is no unincorporated land in Massachusetts; the land area of the state is completely divided up among the 351 municipalities.

Gallery

List of municipalities

Geography of towns at formation
This map shows towns colored by the date they were incorporated in Massachusetts since the founding of Plimoth Plantation in 1620. Many of the towns and future cities shown covering the area of their original incorporation have since been divided into two, three or in some cases several smaller municipalities. For example, Dorchester was incorporated in 1630 and originally included all of the current Dorchester, now the largest neighborhood of Boston, plus the Boston neighborhood of Mattapan, and all of present-day Quincy, Milton, Braintree, Randolph, Holbrook, Canton, Sharon, Stoughton, Avon and the northeast portion of Foxboro. Nearly all of Massachusetts territory had been incorporated by 1815, with the final three areas of Erving (1838), Gay Head (now Aquinnah) and Mashpee (both 1870) being incorporated from previously Native American land.

Former municipalities

Some towns and cities were annexed to others; disincorporated; or ceded to another state in their entirety. This list does not include territory changes affecting only part of a municipality; see History of Massachusetts.

Annexations
The following formerly independent municipalities have been annexed to Boston:
 Brighton (1873)
 Charlestown (1873)
 Dorchester (1869)
 Hyde Park (1912)
 Roxbury (1867)
 West Roxbury (1873)

The town of Bradford was annexed to Haverhill, Massachusetts in 1897.

Disincorporations
The following towns were disincorporated in 1938 due to the construction of the Quabbin Reservoir; all their territory was absorbed into surrounding towns:
 Dana
 Enfield
 Greenwich
 Prescott

Cessions
The following towns were ceded to the Rhode Island colony in 1747 as part of a border dispute:
 Barrington
 Bristol
 Little Compton
 Tiverton 
 Warren (Sowams) [possibly part of Swansea, Massachusetts in 1747?]

Due to a 1642 surveying error and long-running political disputes, the following Massachusetts towns joined the Connecticut Colony in late 1749:
 Enfield
 Somers
 Suffield
 Woodstock

Due to general lack of colonial government there, all four towns in colonial New Hampshire chose to become part of the Massachusetts Bay Colony in 1641.  They were ceded to the re-formed Province of New Hampshire in 1680, under a newly issued royal charter.
 Dover
 Exeter
 Hampton
 Portsmouth

Numerous towns were ceded to New Hampshire after the Northern boundary of Massachusetts was defined by royal decree in 1741. 
 Dunstable North
 Naticook
 Nottingham

Those towns were later disincorporated and reincorporated under New Hampshire laws on the same day in 1746.

All settlements in the District of Maine were ceded when the state of Maine gained its independence from Massachusetts in 1820 as part of the Missouri Compromise.

Archaic names

Many municipalities have changed names.

See also
 Administrative divisions of Massachusetts
 Equivalent Lands
 Lists of cities in the United States
 List of villages in Massachusetts
 Massachusetts gateway cities

Notes

References

External links

Massachusetts City and Town Directory, Secretary of the Commonwealth, Elections Division

Municipalities
Massachusetts
Massachusetts